Solomon Garcia Smith (March 6, 1871 – August 28, 1933) was an American professional boxer in the featherweight division. He was a World Featherweight champion and is the first world champion of Hispanic descent.

Early life
Smith was born in Los Angeles, the son of a Mexican mother and an Irish father. He was an outstanding long-distance track runner in his youth, which may have later aided his ability to endure long boxing bouts.

Professional career

Solomon Garcia Smith made his professional debut in 1888 at the age of 17. In his 21st bout on September 25, 1893, he challenged future hall of famer George Dixon for the World Featherweight Championship but was defeated by seventh-round tko. The fight drew the largest paying crowd recorded at Brooklyn's Coney Island Athletic Club. After the bout, Smith was arrested for participating in a fight with Johnny Griffin in Roby, Indiana, two months earlier. Wyatt Earp had been the timekeeper.

He improved his skills in subsequent bouts and established himself as one of the top fighters in the bantamweight and featherweight divisions, fighting to draws against future hall of fame member Young Griffo and future two-division champion Frank Erne, along with scoring quality wins over opponents such as former champion Torpedo Billy Murphy and avenging a disqualification loss to Oscar Gardner.

World Featherweight Championship
The crowning moment of Smith's career came on October 4, 1897, when he defeated George Dixon in a rematch bout to capture the World Featherweight title, thus ending the Canadian champion's six-year reign. The San Francisco Call wrote of Smith's performance: "Instead of swinging wild and recklessly, as he was wont to do in his early fighting days, he gauged his distance and timed his blows like a polished veteran. His quick ducking under the left arm of his opponent to avoid a jaw warmer was a revelation to his admirers, who repeatedly cheered him when he escaped the hot shots aimed at the jaw point by Professor Dixon"

Smith was seen as a promising champion, having avenged losses to two of the three men who held victories over him up to that point, Dixon and Gardner, with the third being reigning lightweight champion and future hall of fame member Kid Lavigne who had outpointed Smith in an eight round contest. However, after twice retaining his title, he relinquished it due to a mishap against Dave Sullivan. Smith had the misfortune to break his left arm near the wrist in the second round of their bout, ending his chances to give a good showing. Unable to use his left at all in the fourth and fifth rounds, he was deemed unable to continue.

His career took a downward spiral following that loss as he won only one out of the fifteen remaining bouts in his career. He retired after a knockout loss to Billy Snailham in 1904.

Professional boxing record
All information in this section is derived from BoxRec, unless otherwise stated.

Official Record

All newspaper decisions are officially regarded as “no decision” bouts and are not counted as a win, loss or draw.

Unofficial record

Record with the inclusion of newspaper decisions to the win/loss/draw column.

See also
List of Mexican boxing world champions
List of world featherweight boxing champions

References

External links

American boxers of Mexican descent
Sportspeople from Los Angeles County, California
Boxers from California
World boxing champions
World featherweight boxing champions
Featherweight boxers
1871 births
1933 deaths
American male boxers